Elachista cahorsensis is a moth of the family Elachistidae. It is found from Great Britain, Ireland and Germany to the Pyrenees.

The larvae feed on red fescue (Festuca rubra) mining the leaves. The mine starts as a small gallery close to the base of the leaf. It ascends to just under the tip of the leaf, and finally widens to the full width of the blade. The frass is deposited in the basal part of the mine. Larvae can be found in July and again from September to November. They are pale grey with a semi-transparent, reddish brown head.

References

cahorsensis
Leaf miners
Moths described in 1992
Moths of Europe